Lynnette Haozous (born 1985) a Native American painter, printmaker, jeweler, writer, and actor. She is an enrolled member of the San Carlos Apache Tribe and of Chiricahua Apache, Navajo, and Taos Pueblo ancestry. Haozous works in acrylics, watercolors, spray paint, jewelry, screen-printing, writing, and acting on stage and in film. She is known for her murals and uses a blend of art and advocacy to bring attention to social conditions and injustices.

Biography 
Lynnette Haozous is of Chiricahua Apache, Navajo, and Taos Pueblo ancestry. She spent her childhood and adolescence in Arizona and New Mexico. Haozous has said that moving a lot and spending time with family in each of these locations helped her to develop a "profound connection to all sides of my ancestors, and each has had an influence on my work." Haozous is from an artistic family and was influenced by her great uncle, Allan Houser, a renowned sculptor.

Haozous graduated from New Mexico Highlands University in 2016 with a bachelor's degree in social work. She also studied studio arts at Central New Mexico Community College.

Career 

Lynnette Haozous is an artivist, using art for positive social change to empower and strengthen communities. She works in many mediums including painting, jewelry, screen-printing, writing, and acting, but is most well known for her murals, which use a combination of spray paint and stencils.  Haozous has said, "What I like about doing murals is that they speak directly to the community; they're readily available. You can speak directly to the people about these social issues that are impacting them in their own neighborhoods and communities."

In 2020 Haozous's mixed media installation, Braiding Reconciliation, was featured in the Reconciliation exhibit at the IAIA Museum of Contemporary Native Arts (MoCNA). The exhibit was developed by Native American and Indo-Hispano artists and centered truth, racial healing, and transformation—grounded in the promise of reconciliation. The exhibit responded to a decades long journey to end La Entrada, a local annual pageant depicting the 1692 reconquest of New Mexico by the Spanish empire. Lynnette Haozous's installation used cords to represent past traumas and the future promise of reconciliation. Knots in the cords recalled those used by Pueblo runners to communicate and mark time during the successful Pueblo Revolt of 1680. At the base of Haozous's installation, rocks from communities throughout the region anchored the cords.
Lynnette Haozous's first art installation outside of New Mexico was commissioned by the Portland Art Museum as part of the Mesh exhibit. The 2021 Mesh exhibit featured the work of four Native American artists whose multidisciplinary work touched on social issues including the ongoing fight against racial injustice and conflicts over Indigenous land rights. The exhibit spotlighted Native American culture and reminded viewers that art is an essential form of activism. Haozous's mural, titled Into the Sun, "re-matriates" or reasserts the presence and power of Native women in a colonial space.

Works

Murals

Mixed Media

Artist Residence 

 2012 Nativo Lodge/SWAIA Artist Residency
 2017 Nativo Lodge Artists Rooms Residency
 2018–2019 Santa Fe Art Institute Truth and Reconciliation Residency

Fellowship 

 2020 Native Arts and Culture Foundation Mentor Artist Fellowship Award

References

External links 
 
 Rooted Episode 1: Lynette Haozous Art
 Lynnette Haozous at Standing Rock protest.
 Lynnette Haozous interview with the ABQ television show based in Albuquerque.

Muralists
Apache people
American people of Navajo descent
American people of Pueblo descent
Native American artists
Native American activists
1985 births
Living people
Native American women artists
21st-century Native American women
21st-century Native Americans